Chavo can have two or more meanings, for example. In Puerto Rico it means “Money”. In Mexico and some other Latin American country’s the word wold translates to "kid", and may refer to:

 Chavo Guerrero Sr., a professional wrestler
 Chavo Guerrero Jr., a professional wrestler who is best known for his work in World Wrestling Entertainment
 Chavo Pederast, one of the lead singers from hardcore punk band Black Flag

See also
 El Chavo (disambiguation)